Baron Londesborough, of Londesborough in the East Riding of the County of York, is a title in the Peerage of the United Kingdom. It was created in 1850 for the diplomat and Whig politician Lord Albert Denison. He was the third son of Henry Conyngham, 1st Marquess Conyngham, and his wife Elizabeth Denison. Born Albert Denison Conyngham, he assumed by royal licence the surname of Denison in lieu of Conyngham in 1849 on inheriting the vast fortune of his maternal uncle William Joseph Denison (1770–1849). Before his elevation to the peerage, Denison had represented Canterbury in Parliament. His eldest son, the second Baron, sat as a Liberal Member of Parliament for Beverley and Scarborough. In 1887 he was created Viscount Raincliffe, of Raincliffe in the North Riding of the County of York, and Earl of Londesborough, in the County of York. These titles were also in the Peerage of the United Kingdom. However, the viscountcy and earldom became extinct on the death of his grandson, the fourth Earl, in 1937.

The barony was inherited by the late Earl's second cousin once removed, the sixth Baron. He was the son of Rear-Admiral the Hon. Albert Denison, second son of the first Baron. On his death this line of the family failed, and the title passed to his first cousin, the seventh Baron. He was the only son of Commander the Hon. Conyngham Albert Denison, fourth son of the first Baron. When he died this line of the family also failed. He was succeeded by his first cousin, the eighth Baron. He was the only son of the Hon. Harold Albert Denison, fifth son of the first Baron. , the title is held by his only son, the ninth Baron, who succeeded in 1968. As a male-line descendant of the first Marquess Conyngham, he is also in remainder to this peerage and its subsidiary titles.

Baron Londesborough (1850)
Albert Denison Denison, 1st Baron Londesborough (1805–1860)
William Henry Forester Denison, 2nd Baron Londesborough (1834–1900) (created Earl of Londesborough in 1887)

Earl of Londesborough (1887)
William Henry Forester Denison, 1st Earl of Londesborough (1834–1900).
William Francis Henry Denison, 2nd Earl of Londesborough (1864–1917). Married Grace Augusta Fane, daughter of the 12th Earl of Westmorland on 11 August 1887. Father of Irene Mountbatten, Marchioness of Carisbrooke.
George Francis William Henry Denison, 3rd Earl of Londesborough (1892–1920).
Hugo William Cecil Denison, 4th Earl of Londesborough (1894–1937). Married Marigold Lubbock, daughter of Edgar Lubbock, brewer and banker, in 1935.

Baron Londesborough (1850; reverted)
Captain Ernest William Denison, 6th Baron Londesborough (1876–1963).
Captain Conyngham Charles Denison, 7th Baron Londesborough (1885–1967).
John Albert Lister Denison, 8th Baron Londesborough (1901–1968).
Richard John Denison, 9th Baron Londesborough (born 1959). Elected to the House of Lords in 2021.

The heir apparent and sole heir to the barony is the present holder's only son, Hon. James Frederick Denison (born 1990).

Male-line family tree

See also
Marquess Conyngham

References

External links

Baronies in the Peerage of the United Kingdom
Noble titles created in 1850
Noble titles created for UK MPs
Londesborough